Omar Ahmed El Ghazaly (born 9 February 1984 in Cairo) is an Egyptian discus thrower.

He originally played handball, while his siblings were on the Egyptian national swimming team.

In 1999 he was recruited by former African shot put champion Nagui Asaad, who was setting up a throwing school that also included hammer thrower Mohsen El Anany and shot putter Yasser Fathy. After having a try with the different implements, he settled for the discus and rapidly made his debut in the national team. In 2000, aged 16, he was selected for the Egyptian team for the World Junior Championships, where he finished in 17th. That year he also won the Arab Championships with a throw of 53.07 m. At the 2002 World Junior Championships, a poor result of 10th was due to a shoulder injury. In 2003, his final year as a junior, he set a new junior world record of 65.88.

His personal best throw is 66.58 metres, achieved in June 2007 in Helsingborg. This is the current national record. In 2007, he also became the first Egyptian athlete to reach the final of an event at the Athletics World Championships.

His 2008 season did not go as well due to a series of injuries.

In June 2009, El Ghazaly gave a strong showing at a meeting in Sollentuna, Sweden, registering a number of throws over 65 metres and winning with 66.34 m. This was an African season's best throw and highlighted him as a possible finalist for the 2009 World Championships in Athletics. He again reached the final, but could only achieve 9th place.

His 2010 season was again marred by injury.

Achievements

References

1984 births
Living people
Sportspeople from Cairo
Egyptian male discus throwers
Athletes (track and field) at the 2004 Summer Olympics
Athletes (track and field) at the 2008 Summer Olympics
Athletes (track and field) at the 2012 Summer Olympics
Olympic athletes of Egypt
African Games gold medalists for Egypt
African Games medalists in athletics (track and field)
Universiade medalists in athletics (track and field)
Athletes (track and field) at the 2003 All-Africa Games
Athletes (track and field) at the 2007 All-Africa Games
Universiade medalists for Egypt
Competitors at the 2003 Summer Universiade
Medalists at the 2005 Summer Universiade
Medalists at the 2007 Summer Universiade
Islamic Solidarity Games medalists in athletics
Islamic Solidarity Games competitors for Egypt
21st-century Egyptian people